Springdale Mill Complex, also known as Springdale Flour Mill, is a historic grist mill complex located near Bartonsville, Frederick County, Virginia. The mill was built about 1788, and is constructed of coursed rubble limestone with wood-frame end gables.  Associated with the mill are a number of outbuildings which were erected in the late 19th and early 20th centuries, a -story rubble limestone residence, and a -story wood-frame residence.

It was listed on the National Register of Historic Places in 1982.

See also
 National Register of Historic Places listings in Frederick County, Virginia

References

External links
 
 Millpictures.com

1788 establishments in Virginia
Buildings and structures in Frederick County, Virginia
Flour mills in the United States
Grinding mills on the National Register of Historic Places in Virginia
Industrial buildings completed in 1788
National Register of Historic Places in Frederick County, Virginia